TPC Southwind is a private golf club in Shelby County, Tennessee, southern United States, located within the gated community of Southwind in Southeast Memphis.

East-southeast of central Memphis, the 18-hole championship golf course was designed by Ron Prichard, in consultation with tour pros Hubert Green and Fuzzy Zoeller. TPC Southwind opened in 1988, and is a member of the Tournament Players Club network operated by the PGA Tour. It is near the world headquarters of FedEx, adjacent to the west.

TPC Southwind has been the venue for the tour's annual FedEx St. Jude Classic, formerly the Memphis Open, since 1989. The event was previously played at Colonial Country Club in Cordova. TPC Southwind was renovated following the 2004 event.

Course
With 94 bunkers and ten water hazards, TPC Southwind was ranked ninth in difficulty out of 51 courses on the PGA Tour in 2011. Hole #14 at  consistently ranks as one of the toughest par 3's on the PGA Tour.

The course grass is Bermuda for the greens and rough, with Zoysia on the tees and fairways. Prior to 2005, the greens were bent grass.

Course record
The course record is 61, achieved twice professionally in the St. Jude Classic. Jay Delsing carded his in the fourth round in 1993 and tied for eighth place. Bob Estes shot his 61 in the first round in 2001, and held on to win the event by a stroke. Estes also has the only hole-in-one at the 14th hole in the tour event, aced in 2002. Amateur golfer Braden Thornberry also shot the score 61 in a local junior event in August 2012.

Scorecard

The PGA Tour's FedEx St. Jude Classic used the Tournament tees in June 2012, with 3 yards added to hole #11.

References

External links
 

Golf clubs and courses in Tennessee
Shelby County, Tennessee
Buildings and structures in Memphis, Tennessee
1988 establishments in Tennessee